Thomas Edward Plint (1823–1861) was a British stockbroker and important Pre-Raphaelite art collector who commissioned and owned several notable paintings. In 1839, with his friend Charles Reed, he started and edited a magazine called The Leeds Repository.

A religious evangelical, Plint served as a lay preacher at Leeds Congregational Chapel. In 1852, he commissioned Ford Madox Brown to complete Work, a celebration of the protestant work ethic. He demanded changes to the composition, notably the inclusion of a distributor of evangelical tracts, but died before its completion.

He was at one time owner of The Black Brunswicker, which he purchased from  Ernest Gambart. Other paintings in his collection included Millais's Christ in the House of His Parents.

References

British art dealers
1823 births
1861 deaths
Businesspeople from Leeds
19th-century English businesspeople